A bimetallic strip is used to convert a temperature change into mechanical displacement. The strip consists of two strips of different metals which expand at different rates as they are heated. The different expansions force the flat strip to bend one way if heated, and in the opposite direction if cooled below its initial temperature. The metal with the higher coefficient of thermal expansion is on the outer side of the curve when the strip is heated and on the inner side when cooled.

The invention of the bimetallic strip is generally credited to John Harrison, an eighteenth-century clockmaker who made it for his third marine chronometer (H3) of 1759  to compensate for temperature-induced changes in the balance spring. Harrison's invention is recognized in the memorial to him in Westminster Abbey, England.

This effect is used in a range of mechanical and electrical devices.

Characteristics 

The strip consists of two strips of different metals which expand at different rates as they are heated, usually steel and copper, or in some cases steel and brass. The strips are joined together throughout their length by riveting, brazing or welding. The different expansions force the flat strip to bend one way if heated, and in the opposite direction if cooled below its initial temperature. The metal with the higher coefficient of thermal expansion is on the outer side of the curve when the strip is heated and on the inner side when cooled. The sideways displacement of the strip is much larger than the small lengthways expansion in either of the two metals.

In some applications, the bimetal strip is used in the flat form. In others, it is wrapped into a coil for compactness. The greater length of the coiled version gives improved sensitivity.

The curvature of a bimetallic beam can be described by the following equation:

where α1 is the coefficient of thermal expansion of material one and α2 is the coefficient of thermal expansion of material two. ΔT is the current temperature minus the reference temperature (the temperature where the beam has no flexure).

Insight may be gained if the result just given is multiplied on top and bottom by 

History 

The earliest surviving bimetallic strip was made by the eighteenth-century clockmaker John Harrison who is generally credited with its invention. He made it for his third marine chronometer (H3) of 1759  to compensate for temperature-induced changes in the balance spring. It should not be confused with the bimetallic mechanism for correcting for thermal expansion in his gridiron pendulum. His earliest examples had two individual metal strips joined by rivets but he also invented the later technique of directly fusing molten brass onto a steel substrate. A strip of this type was fitted to his last timekeeper, H5. Harrison's invention is recognized in the memorial to him in Westminster Abbey, England.

Composition

Applications 

This effect is used in a range of mechanical and electrical devices.

Clocks 

Mechanical clock mechanisms are sensitive to temperature changes as each part has tiny tolerance and it leads to errors in time keeping. A bimetallic strip is used to compensate this phenomenon in the mechanism of some timepieces. The most common method is to use a bimetallic construction for the circular rim of the balance wheel. What it does is move a weight in a radial way looking at the circular plane down by the balance wheel, varying then, the momentum of inertia of the balance wheel. As the spring controlling the balance becomes weaker with the increasing temperature, the balance becomes smaller in diameter to decrease the momentum of inertia and keep the period of oscillation (and hence timekeeping) constant.

Nowadays this system is not used anymore since the appearance of low temperature coefficient alloys like nivarox, parachrom and many others depending on each brand.

Thermostats 

In the regulation of heating and cooling, thermostats that operate over a wide range of temperatures are used. In these, one end of the bimetallic strip is mechanically fixed and attached to an electrical power source, while the other (moving) end carries an electrical contact. In adjustable thermostats another contact is positioned with a regulating knob or lever. The position so set controls the regulated temperature, called the set point.

Some thermostats use a mercury switch connected to both electrical leads. The angle of the entire mechanism is adjustable to control the set point of the thermostat.

Depending upon the application, a higher temperature may open a contact (as in a heater control) or it may close a contact (as in a refrigerator or air conditioner).

The electrical contacts may control the power directly (as in a household iron) or indirectly, switching electrical power through a relay or the supply of natural gas or fuel oil through an electrically operated valve. In some natural gas heaters the power may be provided with a thermocouple that is heated by a pilot light (a small, continuously burning, flame). In devices without pilot lights for ignition (as in most modern gas clothes dryers and some natural gas heaters and decorative fireplaces) the power for the contacts is provided by reduced household electrical power that operates a relay controlling an electronic ignitor, either a resistance heater or an electrically powered spark generating device.

Thermometers 

A direct indicating dial thermometer, common in household devices (such as a patio thermometer or a meat thermometer), uses a bimetallic strip wrapped into a coil in its most common design. The coil changes the linear movement of the metal expansion into a circular movement thanks to the helicoidal shape it draws. One end of the coil is fixed to the housing of the device as a fix point and the other drives an indicating needle inside a circular indicator. A bimetallic strip is also used in a recording thermometer. Breguet's thermometer consists of a tri-metallic helix in order to have a more accurate result.

Heat engine 

Heat engines are not the most efficient ones, and with the use of bimetallic strips the efficiency of the heat engine is even lower as there is no chamber to contain the heat. Moreover, the bimetallic strips cannot produce strength in its moves, the reason why is that in order to achieve reasonables bendings (movements) both metallic strips have to be thin to make the difference between the expansion noticeable.  So the uses for metallic strips in heat engines are mostly in simple toys that have been built to demonstrate how the principle can be used to drive a heat engine.

Electrical devices 

Bimetal strips are used in miniature circuit breakers to protect circuits from excess current. A coil of wire is used to heat a bimetal strip, which bends and operates a linkage that unlatches a spring-operated contact. This interrupts the circuit and can be reset when the bimetal strip has cooled down.

Bimetal strips are also used in time-delay relays, gas oven safety valves, thermal flashers for older turn signal lamps, and fluorescent lamp starters. In some devices, the current running directly through the bimetal strip is sufficient to heat it and operate contacts directly.  It has also been used in mechanical PWM voltage regulators for automotive uses.

See also 

 Thermotime switch

References 

 Article about compensating the balance wheel against temperature changes by Hodinkee magazine
 Article about the hairspring used in watches by Monochrome magazine

Notes

External links 

 Video of a circular bimetallic wire powering a small motor with iced water. Accessed February 2011.
 Video of a bimetlic coil powering engine (among others like Curie, Stirling and Hero)

English inventions
Engineering thermodynamics
Mechanical engineering
Heating, ventilation, and air conditioning
Energy conversion
Thermometers
Bimetal